Bergenin, alias cuscutin, is trihydroxybenzoic acid glycoside. It is the C-glycoside of 4-O-methyl gallic acid. It possesses an O-demethylated derivative called norbergenin. These are chemical compounds and drugs of Ayurveda, commonly known as Paashaanbhed. It shows a potent immunomodulatory effect.

Bergenin can be isolated from Bergenia species like Bergenia ciliata and Bergenia ligulata, from rhizomes of Bergenia stracheyi. It is also found in the stem bark of Dryobalanops aromatica, in Ardisia elliptica and in Mallotus japonicus.

References

External links

O-methylated natural phenols
Phenolic acid glucosides
C-glycoside natural phenols